Edwin Patricio Hurtado Zurita (born 9 August 1970) is an Ecuadorian football coach and former player who played as a forward. He is the current manager of Cumbayá.

Career
Hurtado began his career with El Nacional in 1990, he also played for L.D.U. Quito, Macará, Técnico Universitario, Tungurahua SC and UTE.

Honours

As a player
 El Nacional
 Ecuadorian Serie A: 1992
 L.D.U. Quito
 Ecuadorian Serie A: 1998, 1999

As a manager
 Técnico Universitario
 Ecuadorian Serie B: 2017

References

External links

1970 births
Living people
Ecuadorian footballers
Ecuador international footballers
1991 Copa América players
1995 Copa América players
C.D. El Nacional footballers
L.D.U. Quito footballers
C.S.D. Macará footballers
C.D. Técnico Universitario footballers
Ecuadorian Serie A players
People from Píllaro Canton
Association football forwards
Ecuadorian football managers
C.D. Técnico Universitario managers
Cumbayá F.C. managers